Sands of Salzaar (trans.: Tribe and Scimitar) is a 2021 fantasy strategy action role-playing game for Microsoft Windows, developed by Chinese indie video game company Han-Squirrel Studio, and published by Hong Kong company XD. The player controls a customized character to battle, recruit troops, manage a fief, and explore dungeons. The game was launched as an Early Access title on January 3, 2020 and fully released on December 16, 2021.

The game is set in the fictional realm of Salzaar, a region marred by war after the collapse of great empire, with a fantasy blend of pre-modern Chinese, Mongolian, and Arabic culture.  Each area has settlements in which five major factions vie for control. The player may choose one among eight base classes, or create their own, and pick a side or start their own faction. The game features both story-driven campaign and sandbox mode. Sands of Salzaar has been described as a mix of Mount & Blade, Diablo, League of Legends and Dynasty Warriors.

Gameplay 
The game is open ended with a variety of quests and a focus on large crowd combat with a focus on troop recruitment. The game has two main modes: story and open-world. The game has a variety of classes including Berserker, Jackal, Knight Errant, Sentinel,Shaman, Spirit Witch, Spiritmancer and Sultan. Each one pursues their own exclusive quests and skill trees. A  variety of equipment is available to the player, while each level-up adds a skill point that can be used to get new skills. The world map is separated into six areas with different biomes: desert, canyon, uplands, snow, and swamp.

Combat in Sands of Salzaar offers a unique mix of ideas. Sands of Salzaar brings an army vs army approach with an instanced map bringing multiple enemy troops around the battlefield, with each squad moving at different speeds and strong emphasis on troops gathering and strategy commanding the player's army.

Reception 
The game's RPG approach and isometric view usually brings comparisons to the Diablo series and games like it: the progression, the equipment, the mouse and keyboard oriented controls, the character's set of skills on the bottom part of the screen. 

It drew comparisons to the war strategy RPG series Mount & Blade and the isometric strategy oriented gameplay of League of Legends,

References

External links
 

2021 video games
Action role-playing video games
Fantasy video games
Role-playing video games
Open-world video games
Video games featuring protagonists of selectable gender
Early access video games
Windows games
Windows-only games
Single-player video games
Historical simulation games
Video games developed in China
Indie video games